Leuciscus burdigalensis, the beaked dace,  is a cyprinid freshwater fish from central and southern France. It is recorded both from Atlantic and Mediterranean drainages – from Loire to Garonne, and from Tech to Aude, respectively. Dace recorded in the Herault may also be L. burdigalensis.

See also 
 Bearn beaked dace
 Long-snout dace

References 

Leuciscus
Cyprinid fish of Europe
Fish described in 1844
Taxa named by Achille Valenciennes